Cheese curds are moist pieces of curdled milk, eaten either alone or as a snack, or used in prepared dishes. They are consumed throughout the northern United States and Canada. Notably, cheese curds are popular in Quebec, as part of the dish poutine (made of French fries topped with cheese curds and gravy), and in Wisconsin and Minnesota where they can be served breaded and deep fried. Curds are sometimes referred to as "squeaky cheese" or crottes de fromage (literally: "droppings of cheese").

Production
Cheese curds are made from fresh pasteurized milk to which cheese culture and rennet are added. After the milk curdles it is then cut into cubes; the result is a mixture of whey and curd. This mixture is then cooked and pressed to release the whey from the curd, creating the final product.

Characteristics
Their flavour is mild, but can differ in taste depending on the process by which they were made. It has about the same firmness and density as cheese, but with a springy or rubbery texture. Fresh curds squeak against the teeth when bitten into. This "squeak" has been described by The New York Times as sounding like "balloons trying to neck". After 12 hours, even under refrigeration, cheese curds lose much of their "fresh" characteristic, particularly the "squeak", due to moisture entering the curd. Keeping them at room temperature can preserve the squeakiness.

The curds have a mild flavour and are sometimes somewhat salty. Most varieties, as in Ontario, Quebec, Nova Scotia, Vermont, or New York State, are naturally uncoloured. The American variety is usually yellow or orange, like most American Cheddar cheese.

Uses

Fresh
Fresh cheese curds are often eaten as a snack, finger food, or an appetizer. They may be served alone, dressed with an additional flavor, or with another food, such as a small smoked sausage or piece of cured pork, with the elements skewered together on a toothpick. Examples of flavorings applied to fresh curds include jalapeño chili peppers, garlic, various herbs, or spice blends such as Cajun seasoning, with garlic and dill on cheddar curds being a popular combination.

Fried cheese curds

Deep-fried cheese curds are often found at carnivals and fairs, and often local non-chain fast-food restaurants and at regular restaurants and bars, as well as a few chain restaurants of local origin, such as Culver's.  Deep-fried cheese curds are covered with a batter similar to one used for onion rings or breading, and placed in a deep fryer. They are sometimes served with a side of ketchup, marinara sauce, or ranch dressing. They are strongly associated with the U.S. state of Wisconsin.

In many areas where fried cheese curds are common, the term "cheese curds" refers to the fried variety; non-fried curds are distinguished by calling them "raw" or "plain" cheese curds.

In some areas, deep-fried cheese curds are also known as cheeseballs.

Poutine

Cheese curds are a main ingredient in poutine, which originated in the 1950s in rural Quebec, Canada. It consists of french fries topped with fresh cheese curds, covered with brown gravy and sometimes additional ingredients.

See also
 Cottage cheese
 Fried cheese
 Halloumi
 Leipäjuusto (Finnish squeaky cheese)
 List of cheeses

References

American cheeses
Canadian cheeses
Cuisine of Wisconsin
Cuisine of the Midwestern United States
Cuisine of the Northeastern United States
Canadian cuisine
Cuisine of Quebec
Curd
Snack foods
Convenience foods